ETR (Italian: Elettro Treno Rapido, "Rapid Electric Train") is a series of Italian high-speed trains.

Tilting EMU trains
ETR 401
ETR 450
ETR 460
ETR 470
ETR 480
 ETR 600/610 (New Pendolino)
These models are often referred as Pendolino.

Non-tilting trains
ETR 200
ETR 220
ETR 300 (Settebello)
ETR 250 (Arlecchino)
ETR 1000
ETR 500
ETR 700

See also
New Pendolino
Eurostar Italia
Treno Alta Velocità
Trenitalia
Rete Ferroviaria Italiana

High-speed trains of Italy